Ibuki may refer to one of the following ships of the Imperial Japanese Navy named after Mount Ibuki:

 , an  armoured cruiser launched in 1907; re-classed as a battlecruiser in 1912; scrapped in 1923.
 , an incomplete modified  heavy cruiser launched in 1943; converted to a light aircraft carrier; scrapped in 1947.

See also
 Ibuki (disambiguation)

Japanese Navy ship names
Imperial Japanese Navy ship names